Konttho is a 2019 Bengali drama film directed by Nandita Roy and Shiboprosad Mukherjee. The movie is produced by Windows Production.

Plot 
A story of friendship, a story of struggle, Konttho is about the indomitable human spirit. Arjun Mallick is a popular RJ, who is not only famous but well-loved. His listeners connect with him and his voice is music to their ears. Soon he receives the prestigious "Voice of The Year" award and with a loving wife, Pritha and son, Arjun's life seems full of happiness. But before long, his perfect life comes to an absolute halt when he is diagnosed with Laryngeal cancer. The doctors had to perform Laryngectomy to save Arjun's life. Arjun's whole life comes crashing down. He feels distanced from everybody. However, as destiny would have it, he is introduced to Romila, a speech therapist. A vibrant character  herself, Romila, is a divorcee who with her daughter, Saheli, is all set to return to her country, Bangladesh. However, circumstances make her accept Arjun as her patient. With Romila's help, Arjun turns around and accepts all the challenges thrown at him by her to learn how to speak again. Throughout his therapy, Romila gives him daunting challenges to make him use his voice rather than relying on signs and writings. He gives his first slang in his new voice during a heated conversation with a taxi driver. He learns to speak with an esophageal voice. He cannot speak but improvises himself. This is the story of the struggle of a cancer patient and his undaunted spirit. He then takes up the job of an RJ with Laryngeal cancer and the show is a success.

Cast 
 Shiboprosad Mukherjee as RJ Arjun Mallik
 Paoli Dam as Pritha Mallik
 Jaya Ahsan as Romilla Chowdhury
 Koneenica Banerjee as Indrani
 Chitra Sen as Pishima
 Jimmy Tangree as Manoj
 Paran Bandopadhyay as Somnath Da 
 Tanima Sen as Somnath's wife
 Barun Chanda as himself
 Usha Uthup as herself

Production development 
Konttho is inspired by the life of Bibhuti Bhushan Chakraborty, whose life was one of trauma and triumph. He fought on despite losing his voice box. Chakraborty was detected with cancer of the larynx in 1972. Two years later, he went under the knife for the elimination of his voice box. The railway officer was “dumbfounded” when doctors told him he would never speak again, but he declined to give up without combat. So, he learned the technique of developing a speech of his own with the muscles of his food pipe. Medical science terms it as “oesophageal speech”. After months of practice, he perfected the technique and started with sounds, simple phonetic ones, to begin with, followed by a combination of words and then short sentences, and in no time Chakraborty started participating in conversations, leaving cancer specialists stunned. He was soon approached by experts at the Thakurpukur cancer hospital to teach fellow patients the art of speech after voice-box surgery.

https://www.cinestaan.com/articles/2021/feb/23/28863/malayalam-remake-of-konttho-to-star-jayasurya-and-manju-warrier==Remake==
Malayalam remake of the film titled as Meri Awas Suno starring Jayasurya, Manju Warrier, Sshivada was released on 2022.

Soundtrack

External links

References

2019 films
Bengali-language Indian films
2010s Bengali-language films
Indian drama films
Films directed by Nandita Roy and Shiboprosad Mukherjee
Indian films about cancer
Films scored by Anupam Roy
Films scored by Anindya Chatterjee
Films scored by Prasen
Bengali films remade in other languages